The sharp-tailed sandpiper (Calidris acuminata) (but see below) is a small wader.

Taxonomy 
A review of data has indicated that this bird should perhaps better be placed into the genus Philomachus 
– as P. acuminatus – which now contains only the ruff, but if the sharp-tailed sandpiper is merged into it, it would need to accommodate the broad-billed sandpiper.

While the latter is a peculiar calidrid, the sharp-tailed sandpiper is much more similar to other Calidris/Erolia species such as the pectoral sandpiper. On the one hand, its larger size and long-legged stance, and the breast pattern which gradually fades away on the belly as in the ruff instead of having a fairly sharp border as in the Calidris/Erolia stints indicate that placement in Philomachus may be correct. Still, it is just as possible that – given the fairly common instances of hybridization in calidrines – mitochondrial DNA data has given a false picture of this species' true affinities. The curlew sandpiper, which is a proposed parent of the hybrid called "Cooper's sandpiper" ("Calidris" × cooperi) together with the sharp-tailed sandpiper, is another unusual calidrid that is hard to place systematically.

The genus name is from Ancient Greek kalidris or skalidris, a term used by Aristotle for some grey-coloured waterside birds. The specific acuminata is from Latin acuminatus, 'sharp, pointed'.

Distribution and habitat 
It breeds in the boggy tundra of northeast Asia and is strongly migratory, wintering in south east Asia and Australasia. It occurs as a rare autumn migrant to North America, but in western Europe only as a very rare vagrant. There is a single documented record from South America.

Description 
Measurements:

 Size: 22 cm
 Weight: 39-114 g
 Wingspan: 36–43 cm

Breeding adults are a rich brown with darker feather centres above, and white underneath apart from a buff breast. They have a light superciliary line above the eye and a chestnut crown. In winter, sharp-tailed sandpipers are grey above. The juveniles are brightly patterned above with rufous colouration and white mantle stripes.

This bird looks a lot like the pectoral sandpiper, within whose Asian range it breeds. It differs from that species in its breast pattern, stronger supercilium and more rufous crown. It has some similarities to the long-toed stint, but is much larger than the stint.

Behaviour

Breeding 
Little is known of the breeding habits of this species, although it nests on the ground, and the male has a display flight.

Feeding 
These birds forage on grasslands and mudflats, like the pectoral sandpiper, picking up food by sight, sometimes by probing. They mainly eat insects and other invertebrates.

References

External links 

 Oiseaux Photos

sharp-tailed sandpiper
Wading birds
Birds of North Asia
sharp-tailed sandpiper
Taxa named by Thomas Horsfield